Jeff Pustil (born October 9, 1957) is a Canadian actor, director and writer. He is best known for his role as Jack Christian in the television series Check It Out!.

Early life
Pustil was born in Toronto on October 9, 1957. He graduated from McGill University in 1979 with a degree in acting.

Career
Pustil began his career in 1981 when he appeared in a minor role in the World War II film South Pacific 1942.

From 1985 to 1988, Pustil played the role of Jack Christian in the Canadian sitcom Check It Out. In 1989, he went on to provide the voice of the title character's best friend, Zephir in the animated series Babar. He then reprised his role in Babar and the Adventures of Badou.

His film credits include Saw V, Iron Eagle IV, Chicago, Casino Jack and Victoria Day.

His television credits include Blue Murder, Doc, Kung Fu: The Legend Continues, Rin Tin Tin: K-9 Cop, Noddy and Relic Hunter.

Personal life
He has been married to his former Check It Out castmate Kathleen Laskey since 1990.

Filmography

Film

Television

References

External links

1957 births
Canadian male film actors
Canadian male television actors
Canadian male voice actors
Canadian male screenwriters
Canadian voice directors
20th-century Canadian male actors
21st-century Canadian male actors
Male actors from Toronto
McGill University alumni
Living people
21st-century Canadian screenwriters
21st-century Canadian male writers